Ola leaf is a palm leaf used for writing in traditional palm-leaf manuscripts and in fortunetelling (horoscopes) in Southern India and Sri Lanka. The leaves are from the talipot tree, a type of palm, and fortunes are written on them and read by fortune tellers. It is believed that three thousand years ago the seven rishis, sages, wrote everyone's fortunes on the leaves. The National Library of Sri Lanka holds an ola-leaf manuscript collection.

Sinhala letters are round-shaped and are written from left to right. They are the most circular-shaped script found in the Indic scripts. The evolution of the script to the present shapes may have taken place due to writing on ola leaves. Unlike chiseling on a rock, writing on palm leaves has to be more round-shaped to avoid the stylus ripping the Palm leaf while writing on it. When drawing vertical or horizontal straight lines on Ola leaf, the leaves would have been ripped and this also may have influenced Sinhala not to have a period or full stop. Instead a stylistic stop which was known as ‘Kundaliya’ is used. Period and commas were later introduced into Sinhala script after the introduction of paper due to the influence of  Western languages.

The Mukkara Hatana, an ola-leaf manuscript now in the British Museum states that King Parakramabahu IV granted it to the Karavas.

Etymology 
The word Ola derives from the Tamil word Ōlai, meaning palm leaf.

See also 
 Borassus

References

Palm trees in culture
Sri Lankan culture
Indian culture